John Livingston Hopkins Jr. (5 August 1938 – 25 April 2021) was an American novelist and travel writer.

Biography
Hopkins was born in Orange, New Jersey.  

Hopkins lived in Tangier, Morocco from 1962 to 1979 where he was a member of the Anglo/American literary crowd of the 1960s and 1970s, becoming friends with William Burroughs, Paul Bowles and Jane Bowles. 

He wrote several novels, among them Tangier Buzzless Flies and The Flight of the Pelican, and travel memoirs including The Tangier Diaries, The South American Diaries and The White Nile Diaries. 

Latterly Hopkins lived in Oxfordshire, England.

Marriage and children
Hopkins married Ellen Ann Ragsdale in 1977.  They had three sons.

Bibliography

Novels
The Attempt (1968) 
Tangier Buzzless Flies (1972)
The Flight of the Pelican (1983)
In the Chinese Mountains (1990)
All I Wanted was Company (1999)

Diaries
The Tangier Diaries 1962-1979 (1995)
The South American Diaries (2007)
The White Nile Diaries (2014)

References

1938 births
2021 deaths
People from Orange, New Jersey
American travel writers
American male non-fiction writers
Princeton University alumni